Manuel Piti Fajardo Rivero (Manzanillo, November 8, 1930 – Trinidad, November 29, 1960) was a Cuban revolutionary physician and fighter of the Rebel Army in the Sierra Maestra.

Biography 
His primary studies were carried out at the José María Heredia School located in his native town, and then graduated from high school. He moved to Havana where he studied at the University of Havana for Medicine.

Upon graduation he worked as a surgeon at the Emergency Hospital of Havana. He, then, returned to his hometown and worked at the Civil Hospital there. He worked under the commander - Doctor René Vallejo at the La Caridad clinic where they healed the wounded of the Rebel Army and of the clandestine fighters.

Revolutionary path 
Piti Fajardo had the professional responsibility of assisting the wounded Rebel Army sent from the Sierra.

On March 24, 1958, he followed Dr. Vallejo and joined the Sierra. There he changed his duty as a doctor to military and became a soldier. He then participated in the battles of "Santo Domingo","Providencia", "Cuatro Caminos", "Las Mercedes", "El Jigüe", "Cerro Pelado", "Veguitas", "El Meriño" and "El Salto", in which for his outstanding work he finally reached the rank of captain. In the course the construction of several hospitals that were built in the Sierra during the rebellion, where many soldiers of the Rebel Army were saved, under Fidel's orders, he again acted as a doctor while he assumed the position of the arsenal of war and recorded the accounts of the teams.

During the Batista offensive, he acted with the guerrillas as a front-line doctor, attending to the wounded in combat.

When Fidel Castro ordered Commander Eduardo Lalo Sardiñas to go forward with Column No. 12, Simón Bolivar, to stop the forces of tyranny get control of the border of Camagüey and Oriente and get them out of the way of invading columns of Ernesto Che Guevara and Camilo Cienfuegos, as they advance towards Las Villas, Piti Fajardo plans the operations with Sardiñas and Fidel's order is carried out.

Then the Sardiñas troops were divided into two groups for operational purposes. Fajardo was placed in front, to control the Las Tunas Province, Holguín, Puerto Padre and Jobabo, among others. Column 12, formed the Fourth Front and there Piti launched communications, the hospital and combined military operations with Lalo Sardiñas.

After the victory of the revolution 
When the armed struggle triumphed, Manuel Fajardo was promoted to commander, appointed as director of the Civil Hospital of Manzanillo and, later, director of the Military Hospital of Santiago de Cuba. He also assisted a congress in Porto Alegre (Brazil). Shortly after, he was appointed Chief of Operations for the Sierra and directed the capture operations of Manuel Beatón's band.

As a priority of the works of the Camilo Cienfuegos School City, he inaugurated the first unit with 500 «camilitos», on July 26, 1960. For a period of  time, in 1960, he was Fidel's family doctor, when the Chief of the Revolution suffered a respiratory condition.

Death 
In November 1960 he was appointed Chief of Operations in the area of the Escambray Mountains, in the center of Cuba, with the task of cleaning the area of reactionary elements.  In that effort, he was mortally wounded and killed in a confrontation on November 29 of the same year in a rural area 4.5 km west of the town of Trinidad (Las Villas province). He was 30 years old.

References 

People
War-related deaths
Cuban people in health professions
Guerrillas
1930 births
1960 deaths